Jennings Township may refer to:

Indiana
 Jennings Township, Crawford County, Indiana
 Jennings Township, Fayette County, Indiana
 Jennings Township, Owen County, Indiana
 Jennings Township, Scott County, Indiana

Kansas
 Jennings Township, Decatur County, Kansas

Ohio
 Jennings Township, Putnam County, Ohio
 Jennings Township, Van Wert County, Ohio

Township name disambiguation pages